Rocco Niccolas Grimaldi (born February 8, 1993) is an American professional ice hockey forward who is currently playing with the Rockford IceHogs of the American Hockey League (AHL). Grimaldi was drafted by the Florida Panthers in the second round (33rd overall) of the 2011 National Hockey League Entry Draft.

Early life
At the age of five, Grimaldi started to play roller hockey in California. When he was first exposed to the game, he thought it looked more exciting than baseball and basketball. In 2005, Grimaldi and some of his family relocated from Rossmoor to Michigan so that he could play against a better level of competition. As a youth, he played in the 2004 and 2005 Quebec International Pee-Wee Hockey Tournament with the California Wave minor ice hockey team, and in the 2006 Quebec International Pee-Wee Hockey Tournament with the Detroit Little Caesars team.

Playing career
Grimaldi played AAA Hockey for Detroit Little Caesars during the 2008–2009 season, collecting 43 points with 17 goals and 26 assists in 31 games. He then played two seasons with the USA Hockey National Team Development Program against junior teams in the United States Hockey League. During the 2009–10 season, Grimaldi led the United States Under 17 national team in scoring with 40 points in 36 games.

During the 2010–11 season, he led Team USA in scoring with 34 goals and 28 assists in 50 games. Grimaldi was eligible to be drafted into the National Hockey League (NHL) in 2011. Prior to the draft, there were concerns about his size. At 5'6", he is smaller than most NHL players. Grimaldi is not concerned about his size, and takes the questions about it in stride, "I think it’s fun." The 2011–12 Hockey Prospectus ranked Grimaldi as its #36 best hockey prospect noting that he "overcomes his diminutive size with off the chart intangibles and physical ability."

Grimaldi committed to the University of North Dakota and entered his freshman season for UND in the 2011–12 season.

On May 7, 2014, Grimaldi signed a three-year entry-level contract with the Florida Panthers. In the 2014–15 season, Grimaldi made his professional debut with the Panthers AHL affiliate, the San Antonio Rampage. On November 1, 2014, he received his first NHL recall and made his NHL debut with the Panthers in a 2–1 victory over the Philadelphia Flyers the following day. He was again called up to the Panthers on November 18, achieving the rare feat of playing two games in one day—a morning matinee with the Rampage, and another with the Panthers that evening (the morning game, coupled with the Panthers playing on the West Coast that evening and thus played three hours later than usual, allowed Grimaldi the time to travel to the second game).

On June 23, 2016, Grimaldi was traded by the Panthers to the Colorado Avalanche for goaltender Reto Berra. After attending his first training camp with the Avalanche, Grimaldi was reassigned to affiliate and former AHL club, the San Antonio Rampage, on September 30, 2016, to begin the 2016–17 season. After 19 games, Grimaldi was leading the Rampage in scoring with 15 points, when he received his first recall to Colorado on December 2, 2016. He made his Avalanche debut the following night in a 3–0 defeat to the Dallas Stars and was returned to the Rampage at the conclusion of the game.

On July 26, 2017, the Avalanche re-signed Grimaldi to a one-year, two-way contract. In the 2017–18 season, Grimaldi spent the majority of the campaign with the Rampage, where he recorded 31 points in 49 games. He played in a further 6 games in the NHL with the Avalanche, posting a goal and two assists and recording his second-career two-point game on October 28, 2017, against the Chicago Blackhawks.

As a group IV free agent, Grimaldi opted to leave the Avalanche and agreed to a one-year, two-way contract with the Nashville Predators on July 1, 2018.

On February 24, 2020, during the NHL Trade Deadline, the Predators signed Grimaldi to a two-year contract extension. On March 25, 2021, in a home game against the Detroit Red Wings, Grimaldi scored 3 goals in the 1st period. This was his first career hat trick, and he set a franchise record for the fastest hat trick by a Predators player (2 minutes and 34 seconds). He would add a 4th goal in the third period, making him only the 2nd player in Predators history to score 4 goals in 1 game along with Eric Nystrom.

As a free agent from the Predators at the conclusion of his contract following the  season, Grimaldi went un-signed over the summer. In preparation for the  season, Grimaldi agreed to join the Anaheim Ducks on a professional tryout basis, attending training camp and the pre-season. After impressing through the Ducks pre-season, Grimaldi was signed to a one-year AHL contract with affiliate, the San Diego Gulls, on October 15, 2022. Grimaldi was leading the languishing Gulls in scoring, notching 27 goal and 56 points through only 54 games before he was traded to the Rockford IceHogs on March 2, 2023.

International play

Grimaldi was selected to the United States Under 18 team and helped the team win their second straight World Championship on April 10, 2010. In the gold medal game versus Sweden, Grimaldi had one goal and one assist as the United States triumphed by a 3–1 mark. Rocco Grimaldi scored twice vs. Finland on Friday, November 12 at the 2010 Men's Under-18 Four Nations Cup.

He was a member of Team USA's Gold Medal team at the 2013 World Junior Ice Hockey Championships, scoring two goals, including the game winner, in the championship game vs. Sweden.

Personal life
Grimaldi was born in Anaheim, California. Grimaldi is a devout born-again Christian. His father was a police officer in California. His mother was the Little Caesars AAA Hockey club team manager.

In July 2016, Grimaldi married Abigail (Abby) Mattson.

Career statistics

Regular season and playoffs

International

Awards and honors

References

External links 
 

1993 births
American men's ice hockey centers
Colorado Avalanche players
Florida Panthers draft picks
Florida Panthers players
Ice hockey players from California
Living people
Rossmoor, California
Milwaukee Admirals players
Nashville Predators players
North Dakota Fighting Hawks men's ice hockey players
Portland Pirates players
Rockford IceHogs (AHL) players
San Antonio Rampage players
San Diego Gulls (AHL) players
Sportspeople from Anaheim, California
USA Hockey National Team Development Program players